The 2018 ASUN Conference baseball tournament was held at Harmon Stadium on the campus of the University of North Florida in Jacksonville, Florida, from May 23 through 26.  As the winner of the tournament for the league-best eighth time,  claimed the ASUN Conference's automatic bid to the 2018 NCAA Division I baseball tournament.

Format and seeding
The 2018 tournament was a double-elimination tournament in which the top six conference members participated.  Seeds were determined based on conference winning percentage from the round-robin regular season.

Bracket and results

All-Tournament Team
The following players were named to the All-Tournament Team.

Most Valuable Player
Eric Foggo was named Tournament Most Valuable Player.  Foggo was a freshman first baseman for Stetson, who batted 6 for 14 for the Tournament with 4 RBI.

References

ASUN Conference Baseball Tournament
Tournament
ASUN Conference baseball tournament
ASUN baseball tournament